Wang U may refer to:

Yejong of Goryeo (1079–1122), king of Goryeo
Wang U, husband of Princess Suan 1179–1199 (her death)
U of Goryeo (1365–1389), king of Goryeo
Prince Jeongyang (died 1397), brother of Gongyang of Goryeo

See also
Wang Wu (disambiguation)